Haron Shakava (born 26 November 1992) is a Kenyan professional footballer who plays for Nkana FC in the Zambia Super League and the Kenya national team as a defender.

International career
Shakava made his debut for Kenya national team on 4 July 2015, in a second leg match of the 2016 African Nations Championship qualification against Ethiopia. The match ended with a 0–0 draw, and Kenya was eliminated in the preliminary round because of losing the first leg 2–0.

On 7 October 2015, Shakava scored a goal for Kenya in a 5–2 win against Mauritius in the first round of the 2018 FIFA World Cup qualification.

International goals
Scores and results list Kenya's goal tally first.

Honours
 Kenyan Premier League: 2014
In January 28th 2018, Haroun Shakava led his team Gor Mahia in the Supercup match against AFC Leopards at Afraha Stadium. He scored the only goal with an assistance from George Odhiambo, that made the team winners of the cup. It is now Gor Mahia 5th Supercup in nine years. The match ended 1–0.

References

External links
 
 
 Gor Mahia profile

1993 births
Living people
Association football defenders
Kenyan footballers
Kenya international footballers
Kenyan Premier League players
Gor Mahia F.C. players
Kakamega Homeboyz F.C. players